Armada Area Schools is a public school district located in Armada, Michigan. The district consists of five schools, Orville C. Krause Early Elementary School, Orville C. Krause Late Elementary School, Armada Middle School, Armada High School & The Macomb Academy of Arts & Science. The district is led by superintendent Michael G. Musary. The administration office is located on Burk Street in Armada.

History
The Armada school district began back in the late 1920s, when they built a brand new two-story building holding kids K-12 grade. In 1956, the district decided to build a new high school (now the middle school) holding kids 10-12 which moved some of the kids from the old building to the new one. That school lasted as a high school until 1976 when it was renovated and became the present day middle school which would hold kids in grades 7-9 (now 6-8). At the same time they turned the high school to a middle school, they were building a brand new high school which opened in the fall of 1976

Due to the increasing population of the district, In the fall of 1999 built a new elementary school, Orville C. Krause Elementary School (formally Armada Elementary School)

Board Of Education 2015-present
The Armada Schools board of education

Cheryl Murray – President

Scott Kline –Vice President

Susan Nieman – Treasurer

Judy Tobey – Secretary

Tami Seago – Trustee

Edward Genord – Trustee

Michele Meerschaert – Trustee

Macomb Academy of Arts and Sciences
The Macomb Academy of Arts and Sciences (MA2S) is a regional magnet center for honors-level mathematics, science and technology. Operated by Armada Area Schools, MA2S offers a four-year integrated program for students in grades 9 – 12.

William Zebelian 	Director

Patti Lange 		Secretary

Armada High School
Armada High School (AHS) is located in Armada, Michigan. Armada High School's colors are black and orange and their mascot is a tiger. Grades 9-12 attend the school which usually enrolls about 600-650 students. Armada's principal is Jordan Ackerman and the assistant principal is Mark Gosciewski.

Renovations 
During the spring of 2006 renovations began at Armada Middle and High Schools. Renovations to the building include a new auxiliary gymnasium (which has been dedicated to and renamed the Ed Wuestenberg Gymnasium), new media center, updated classrooms, updated computer labs, updated science labs and a new math wing.

Notable alumni
Dick Enberg

References

External links
 Armada Area Schools Website

School districts in Michigan
Education in Macomb County, Michigan
1920s establishments in Michigan